Robert Alexander Nisbet (September 30, 1913 – September 9, 1996) was an American sociologist, a professor at the University of California, Berkeley, Vice-Chancellor at the University of California, Riverside, and an Albert Schweitzer Professor at Columbia University.

Life 
Nisbet was born in Los Angeles in 1913. He was raised with his three brothers and one sister in the small California community of Maricopa, where his father managed a lumber yard. His studies at University of California, Berkeley culminated in a Ph.D. in sociology in 1939. His thesis was supervised by Frederick J. Teggart. At Berkeley, "Nisbet found a powerful defense of intermediate institutions in the conservative thought of 19th-century Europe. Nisbet saw in thinkers like Edmund Burke and Alexis de Tocqueville—then all but unknown in American scholarship—an argument on behalf of what he called 'conservative pluralism.'" He joined the faculty there in 1939.

After serving in the United States Army during World War II, when he was stationed on Saipan in the Pacific Theatre, Nisbet founded the Department of Sociology at Berkeley, and was briefly Chairman. Nisbet left an embroiled Berkeley in 1953 to become a dean at the University of California, Riverside, and later a Vice-Chancellor. Nisbet remained in the University of California system until 1972, when he left for the University of Arizona at Tucson. Soon after, he was appointed to the Albert Schweitzer Chair at Columbia. He was elected to the American Academy of Arts and Sciences in 1972 and the American Philosophical Society in 1973.

On retiring from Columbia in 1978, Nisbet continued his scholarly work for eight years at the American Enterprise Institute in Washington, D.C. In 1988, President Ronald Reagan asked him to deliver the Jefferson Lecture in Humanities, sponsored by the National Endowment for the Humanities. He died, at 82, in Washington, DC.

Ideas 

Nisbet's first important work, The Quest for Community (New York: Oxford University Press, [1953] 1969), claimed that modern social science's individualism denied an important human drive toward community as it left people without the aid of their fellows to combat the centralizing power of the nation-state. New York Times columnist Ross Douthat called it "arguably the 20th century's most important work of conservative sociology."

Nisbet began his career as a leftist but later confessed a conversion to a philosophical conservatism. While he consistently described himself as a conservative, he also "famously defended abortion rights
and publicly attacked the foreign policy of President Ronald Reagan."

He was a contributor to Chronicles. He was especially concerned with tracing the history and impact of the Idea of Progress. He challenged conventional sociological theories about progress and modernity, insisting on the negative consequences of the loss of traditional forms of community, a process that he believed was greatly accelerated by World War I. According to British sociologist Daniel Chernilo, for Nisbet, "The sociological interest in the formation of modern society lies in whether and how it can re-invigorate forms of communal life and, if not, in understanding what will be the consequences of such failure." Nisbet, thus, "inverts what had been until then the mainstream proposition that society was more important, both historically and normatively, than community." Chernilo also critically observed that Nisbet's "argument on the Great War [World War I] that marks the transition from community to society offers a one-sided view of the historical process as moving unequivocally towards a decaying condition."

Bibliography

Books
 1953.  The Quest for Community:  A Study in the Ethics of Order and Freedom
 1966.  The Sociological Tradition
 1968.  Tradition and Revolt: Historical and Sociological Essays
 1969.  Social Change and History: Aspects of the Western Theory of Development
 1970.  The Social Bond: An Introduction to the Study of Society
 1971.  The Degradation of the Academic Dogma: The University in America, 1945–1970
 1976.  Sociology as an Art Form
 1973.  The Social Philosophers: Community and Conflict in Western Thought
 1974.  The Sociology of Emile Durkheim
 1975.  The Twilight of Authority
 1980.  History of the Idea of Progress
 1983.  Prejudices: A Philosophical Dictionary
 1986.  The Making of Modern Society
 1986.  Conservatism: Dream and Reality
 1988   The Present Age  
 1988.  Roosevelt and Stalin: The Failed Courtship
 1992.  Teachers and Scholars: A Memoir of Berkeley in Depression and War

Articles
 "Foreign Policy and the American Mind". Commentary (September 1961, pp. 194–203).
 
 "The New Despotism". Commentary (July 1976).
 
 
 
 
 "Was There an American Revolution?," The American Conservative, August 3, 2012.
 "social science," Britannica Academic. (Primary Contributor)

References

Further reading
 Carey, George W., July 2010, "Nisbet, War, and American Republic" , The Imaginative Conservative
 Church, Mike, 2012, "Robert Nisbet and the Rise of the Machines,"  The Imaginative Conservative.
 Elliott, Winston, III, 2010, "War, Crisis and Centralization of Power" , The Imaginative Conservative (blog).
 Gordon, Daniel. "The Voice of History within Sociology: Robert Nisbet on Structure, Change, and Autonomy," Historical Reflections (2012) 38#1 pp. 43–63
 Hill, Fred Donovan, 1978, "Robert Nisbet and the Idea of Community," The University Bookman, Volume 18, Number 3.
 Mancini, Matthew J. "Too Many Tocquevilles: The Fable of Tocqueville’s American Reception", Journal of the History of Ideas, Volume 69, Number 2, April 2008, pp. 245–268.
 McWilliams, Susan, Hometown Hero: Robert Nisbet’s conservatism of community against the state , The American Conservative (Feb. 1, 2010)
 Nagel, Robert F., 2004, "States and Localities: A Comment on Robert Nisbet's Communitarianism," Publius, Vol. 34, No. 4.
 
 Schrum, Ethan. The Instrumental University: Education in Service of the National Agenda after World War II. Ithaca, NY: Cornell University Press, 2019.
 Stone, Brad Lowell, 1998 (Spring), "A True Sociologist: Robert Nisbet", The Intercollegiate Review: 38–42.
 
 Stromberg, Joseph, 2000, "The Under-Appreciated Robert Nisbet", antiwar.com.
 Thomas, Robert McG., "Robert Nisbet, 82, Sociologist And Conservative Champion", The New York Times, September 12, 1996.
 Wolfe, Alan, 2010, "Remembering Alienation," New Republic.

External links
 Works by Robert Nisbet at JSTOR
 
 Robert Nisbet and Our Continuing Quest for Community
 

1913 births
1996 deaths
American Enterprise Institute
American sociologists
Columbia University faculty
People from Los Angeles
People from Maricopa, California
University of California, Riverside faculty
University of California, Berkeley faculty
University of California, Berkeley alumni
United States Army personnel of World War II
Members of the American Philosophical Society